Rabah Khedouci (Arabic: رابح خدوسي) is an Algerian writer and novelist. He has two novels and many story series for children. In 1990, his novel Alghoraba’a won the national prize "Iqbal".

Biography 
Rabah Khedouci was born in 1995 in Beni Misra, Algeria. He completed his education in Institute National De Formation Et De Perfictionnment Du Personnel De L'education. Between 1974 and 1997, he worked as a teacher and an education inspector. He is the founder of ‘Dar Alhadara’, a publishing house established in 1992.  Also, he is the founder of ‘Almoa’alm’, an educational and cultural magazine that was started in 2000. Khedouci has two novels Addahya and Alghoraba’a which has won the national prize "Iqbal". His name emerged as one of the interested in children's literature as he published several story series including "A’alam Alfokaha", "Qisasi Aldjamila", and others.

Works

Novels 
The Victim (original title: Addahia), 1984

The Strangers (original title: Al-ghuraba’a), 1990

Short stories 

 The Burning of the Birds (original title: Ihtiraq Ala’assafir), 1988
 The Smart Child (original title: Attifl Addaki), 1995
 The Park of the Wolves (original title: Hadiqat Addia’ab), 2007
 The Bread Seller (original title: Ba’aiat Alkhobz), 2007
 The Car Ti Ti (original title: Assyara Ti Ti), 2007
 Magtaa Kheira, 2007
 Impressions of Man Returned from Cities of Beauty (original title: Intiba’at A’aid mun Mudun Aldjamal), 2009
 Faces and Phenomenon (original title: Woujoh wa Dhawahir), 2014

Story series 

 My beautiful Stories (original title: Qissi Aldjamila)
 The World of Humour (original title: A’alam Alfokaha), 1994
  Figures of Algeria (original title: A’alam Aldjazaee’r), 1997
  Literature of Young-manliness (original title: Adb Alfutuwa), 2007

Awards 
He has won several local awards including:

 The National Prize ‘Iqbal’ for his novel Alghouraba’a,1990
 The Great Award ‘Ibda’a’ for children stories, 1992
 The Ministry of Culture Award for writing for children, 1998

See also 
 Abdelhamid ben Hadouga
 Abderrazak Belagrouz

References 

Algerian novelists
Living people
1955 births
21st-century Algerian people